The 2017–18 KBL season was the 22nd season of the Korean Basketball League (KBL), the highest level of basketball in South Korea. The regular season began play on 14 October 2017 and ended on 13 March 2018, with the play-offs beginning several days after. Seoul SK Knights won its second KBL championship.

Regular season

Playoffs

Individual awards

Yearly awards
Most Valuable Player: Doo Kyung-min (Wonju DB Promy)
Foreign Player of the Year: Deonte Burton (Wonju DB Promy)
Coach of the Year: Lee Sang-beom (Wonju DB Promy)
Rookie of the Year: An Young-jun (Seoul SK Knights)
KBL Best 5
Doo Kyung-min (Wonju DB Promy)
Lee Jung-hyun (Jeonju KCC Egis)
Deonte Burton (Wonju DB Promy)
Aaron Haynes (Seoul SK Knights)
Oh Se-keun (Anyang KGC)
Sixth Man Award: Kim Joo-sung (Wonju DB Promy)
Skill Development Award: Kim Tae-hong (Wonju DB Promy)
Defensive Best 5
Park Chan-hee (Incheon Electroland Elephants)
Lee Dae-sung (Ulsan Hyundai Mobis Phoebus)
Yang Hee-jong (Anyang KGC)
Song Kyo-chang (Jeonju KCC Egis)
Oh Se-keun (Anyang KGC)
Defensive Player of the Year: Park Chan-hee (Incheon Electroland Elephants)
Fair Play Award: Choi Bu-kyung (Seoul SK Knights)

Individual statistic leaders

Round MVP
The following players were named MVP of the Round:
Round 1: Oh Se-keun (Anyang KGC)
Round 2: Ricardo Ratliffe (Seoul Samsung Thunders)
Round 3: Oh Se-keun (Anyang KGC)
Round 4: Doo Kyung-min (Wonju DB Promy)
Round 5: Brandon Brown (Incheon Electroland Elephants)
Round 6: Aaron Haynes (Seoul SK Knights)

See also
2017 Korean Basketball League draft

References

External Links
  

2017–18
2017–18 in South Korean basketball
2017–18 in Asian basketball leagues